Trawniki  is a village in the administrative district of Gmina Drwinia, within Bochnia County, Lesser Poland Voivodeship, in southern Poland.

References

Trawniki